The Great Salt Lake State Marina is a state park in Salt Lake County, Utah, United States.

History
The Great Salt Lake State Marina opened to the public as a state park in 1978, and the marina itself was expanded two years later.

Geography
The park is located at an elevation of 4200 feet, on the south shore of the Great Salt Lake, 16 miles west of Salt Lake City.

Park facilities
The park features a 300 slip marina along with a boat ramp, and is popular for swimming, and picnicking. There are restrooms and showers.

It is home to the Great Salt Lake Yacht Club.

See also
Great Salt Lake

References

External links
 Great Salt Lake State Marina website

Protected areas of Salt Lake County, Utah
State parks of Utah